Nelson Javier Abeijón Pessi (born 21 July 1973) is a retired Uruguayan footballer. He is nicknamed Abe or Abeja, due to his last name similarity with the word abeja (Spanish for bee). He is currently the assistant coach of C.A. Cerro.

Playing career

Club
He started his career in 1994 with Nacional (winning one minor title championship). His role as a holding midfield player and his tough approach of the game made him very popular among his fans. He eventually left the team in the season 1997-1998 when he played in Spain La Liga with Racing de Santander. In August 1998 Abeijón moved to Italian Serie A and then Serie B with Cagliari and Como. In the summer of 2006 he was transferred to Atalanta. During his career he played 282 matches and scored 23 goals.

Abeijón left for Como in 2003 but in January 2004 returned to Cagliari. in July he signed a 2-year contract.

International
Abeijón made his debut for the Uruguay national football team on October 19, 1994 in a friendly match against Peru (0-1 win) in the Estadio Nacional José Díaz in Lima, Peru. He earned a total number of 23 caps for his native country, scoring two goals.

References

External links

  Profile

1973 births
Living people
Footballers from Montevideo
Association football midfielders
Uruguayan footballers
Uruguay international footballers
1995 Copa América players
1997 Copa América players
Copa América-winning players
Club Nacional de Football players
Racing de Santander players
Cagliari Calcio players
Como 1907 players
Atalanta B.C. players
Club Atlético River Plate (Montevideo) players
Uruguayan Primera División players
La Liga players
Serie A players
Serie B players
Uruguayan expatriate footballers
Expatriate footballers in Spain
Expatriate footballers in Italy
Uruguayan expatriate sportspeople in Spain
Uruguayan expatriate sportspeople in Italy
Deportivo Maldonado managers